Maiken Pius (before 2019 Schmidt; born 17 April 1985) is an Estonian actress.

In 2006, she graduated from Tallinn University's choreography department, and in 2012, she graduated from the drama department of the Estonian Academy of Music and Theatre. Since 2012, she is an actress at Tallinn City Theatre. Besides theatrical roles, she has also played on movies and television series.

Filmography

 2010–2019 ENSV (television series; role: Kaire)
 2015 1944 (feature film; role: Aino Tammik)
 2017 Keti lõpp (feature film; role: servant)
 2018 Mihkel (feature film; role: Veera)
 2019 Truth and Justice (feature film; role: Krõõt)

References

1985 births
Living people
Estonian film actresses
Estonian television actresses
Estonian stage actresses
21st-century Estonian actresses
Tallinn University alumni
Estonian Academy of Music and Theatre alumni
Actresses from Tallinn